Jarosław Góra (born 17 October 1964) is a Polish footballer. He played in one match for the Poland national football team in 1992.

References

External links
 

1964 births
Living people
Polish footballers
Poland international footballers
Association football midfielders
Sportspeople from Lublin